Haji Mussa Kitole is a Zanzibari politician and member of the Jahazi Asilia party.

Running as the Jahazi Asilia candidate in the 30 October 2005 Zanzibar presidential election, Kitole placed 3rd out of six candidates, receiving 0.47% of the vote.

References

Zanzibari politicians
Living people
Year of birth missing (living people)
Jahazi Asilia politicians
Place of birth missing (living people)
21st-century Tanzanian politicians